A penumbral lunar eclipse took place on Sunday, July 15, 1973, the third of four lunar eclipses in 1973. In this extremely marginal eclipse, the Moon barely clipped the edge of the Earth's penumbral shadow. This caused a microscopic darkening of just 10.468% of the Moon's disc for 1 hour, 39 minutes and 8 seconds, which was essentially impossible to see. This event marking the beginning of the 148th saros cycle for a lunar eclipse. The Moon was only 2.6 days after apogee (Apogee on Thursday, July 12, 1973), making it 5.9% smaller than average.

Visibility
This penumbral eclipse was visible over eastern Asia, Australia, Pacific, western Americas, seen rising over east in Asia, Australia, and setting over the Americas.

Relation to other lunar eclipses

Eclipses in 1973 
 An annular solar eclipse on Thursday, 4 January 1973.
 A penumbral lunar eclipse on Thursday, 18 January 1973.
 A penumbral lunar eclipse on Friday, 15 June 1973.
 A total solar eclipse on Saturday, 30 June 1973.
 A penumbral lunar eclipse on Sunday, 15 July 1973.
 A partial lunar eclipse on Monday, 10 December 1973.
 An annular solar eclipse on Monday, 24 December 1973.

Lunar year series

Half-Saros cycle
A lunar eclipse will be preceded and followed by solar eclipses by 9 years and 5.5 days (a half saros). This lunar eclipse is related to two partial solar eclipses of Solar Saros 155 on the third and fourth columns.

See also
List of lunar eclipses
List of 20th-century lunar eclipses

Notes

External links

1973-07
1973 in science
July 1973 events